Megan Vaughan,  is a British historian and academic, who specialises in the history of East and Central Africa. Since October 2015, she has been Professor of African History and Health at the Institute of Advanced Studies, University College London. From 2002 to 2016 she was Smuts Professor of Commonwealth History at the University of Cambridge.

Honours
In 1995, Vaughan and Henrietta Moore were awarded the Herskovits Prize by the African Studies Association for their book Cutting Down Trees: Gender, Nutrition, and Agricultural Change in the Northern Province of Zambia, 1890-1990. In 2006, she was awarded the Heggoy Prize for French Colonial History by the French Colonial Historical Society for her book Creating the Creole Island: Slavery in Eighteenth-century Mauritius.

In 2002, Vaughan was elected a Fellow of the British Academy, the United Kingdom's national academy for the humanities and social sciences. On 17 July 2015, she was awarded an honorary Doctor of Letters (DLitt) degree by the University of Kent "in recognition of her contribution to the study of world history".

Selected works

References

Living people
British women historians
Historians of Africa
Historians of agriculture
Historians of slavery
Smuts Professors of Commonwealth History
Academics of University College London
Fellows of the British Academy
Fellows of the Royal Historical Society
British Africanists
Academics of the School of Advanced Study
Year of birth missing (living people)
Presidents of the African Studies Association of the United Kingdom